Campo Limpo is a metro station on Line 5 (Lilac) of the São Paulo Metro in the Campo Limpo district of São Paulo, Brazil.

EMTU lines
The following EMTU bus lines can be accessed:

References

São Paulo Metro stations
Railway stations opened in 2002